Jesse Bourbon Sibley (October 30, 1879 – April, 1968) was a college football and basketball player and coach. He was also a prominent educator in Louisville, Kentucky. Sibley played for the Vanderbilt Commodores, and coached for the Kentucky Wesleyan Panthers.

References

1879 births
1968 deaths
American football guards
Basketball coaches from Kentucky
Kentucky Wesleyan Panthers football coaches
Vanderbilt Commodores football players
Sportspeople from Louisville, Kentucky
People from Shelbyville, Kentucky
Players of American football from Louisville, Kentucky